New Cumberland is a city in and the county seat of Hancock County, West Virginia, United States, along the Ohio River. The population was 1,020 as of the 2020 census. It is part of the Weirton–Steubenville metropolitan area.

History

Pioneer George Chapman settled in the area of present-day New Cumberland in 1783 or 1784 and founded Fort Chapman. In 1839, John Cuppy laid out a town at the site and named it Vernon, although it was also referred to as Cuppytown. Cuppy changed the name to New Cumberland per the requests of the earliest land buyers, naming it after Cumberland, Maryland. The town was incorporated by the West Virginia Legislature in 1872.

When Hancock County was formed in 1848, New Cumberland competed with New Manchester (at the time Fairview, and later, Pughtown) for the county seat. New Cumberland was chosen by thirteen votes in a referendum, but the already-seated courthouse in New Manchester refused to comply. In 1850, New Cumberland won a second referendum by forty-six votes and the seat was moved, but just two years later yet another referendum resulted in a New Manchester victory. In 1884, a final election resolved the matter, and New Cumberland became the permanent county seat.

Local industry in the past involved the manufacture of fire and paving brick, sewer pipe, glassware, foundry and machine-shop products, and tiling. There were also coal mines and mills for the pulverization of fire clay for use in ironworks. The First National Bank-Graham Building and Marshall House are listed on the National Register of Historic Places.

Geography
New Cumberland is located at  (40.499146, -80.607960).

Due to the relative proximity of the Ohio River, New Cumberland has been the victim of several floods. Notable floods include 1959, where approximately 60 families were evacuated.

Climate
This climatic region is typified by large seasonal temperature differences, with warm to hot (and often humid) summers and cold (sometimes severely cold) winters.  According to the Köppen Climate Classification system, New Cumberland has a humid continental climate, abbreviated "Dfb" on climate maps.

Demographics

2010 census
As of the census of 2010, there were 1,103 people, 526 households, and 289 families living in the city. The racial makeup of the city was 97.6% White, 0.5% Asian, 0.4% from other races, and 1.5% from two or more races. Hispanic or Latino of any race were 1.4% of the population.

There were 526 households, of which 21.5% had children under the age of 18 living with them, 38.6% were married couples living together, 11.8% had a female householder with no husband present, 4.6% had a male householder with no wife present, and 45.1% were non-families. 40.5% of all households were made up of individuals, and 19.8% had someone living alone who was 65 years of age or older. The average household size was 2.10 and the average family size was 2.83.

The median age in the city was 47.3 years. 18.3% of residents were under the age of 18; 6.6% were between the ages of 18 and 24; 22% were from 25 to 44; 32.6% were from 45 to 64; and 20.5% were 65 years of age or older. The gender makeup of the city was 46.7% male and 53.3% female.

2000 census
As of the census of 2000, there were 1,099 people, 513 households, and 286 families living in the city. The population density was 897.6 people per square mile (347.8/km2). There were 568 housing units at an average density of 463.9 per square mile (179.8/km2). The racial makeup of the city was 99.27% White, 0.27% Asian, 0.09% from other races, and 0.36% from two or more races. Hispanic or Latino of any race were 1.09% of the population.

There were 513 households, out of which 20.9% had children under the age of 18 living with them, 44.6% were married couples living together, 7.8% had a female householder with no husband present, and 44.1% were non-families. 39.2% of all households were made up of individuals, and 22.4% had someone living alone who was 65 years of age or older. The average household size was 2.12 and the average family size was 2.85.

In the city, the population was spread out, with 19.1% under the age of 18, 6.1% from 18 to 24, 27.2% from 25 to 44, 26.6% from 45 to 64, and 21.0% who were 65 years of age or older. The median age was 43 years. For every 100 females, there were 84.1 males. For every 100 females age 18 and over, there were 79.2 males.

The median income for a household in the city was $28,529, and the median income for a family was $37,589. Males had a median income of $30,625 versus $20,536 for females. The per capita income for the city was $18,109. About 6.2% of families and 9.5% of the population were below the poverty line, including 12.9% of those under age 18 and 7.5% of those age 65 or over.

Education
Children in New Cumberland are served by the Hancock County School District. The current schools serving the city are:
 New Manchester Elementary School – grades K-4
 Oak Glen Middle School – grades 5-8
 Oak Glen High School – grades 9-12

Notable people
 John Bahnsen, United States Army brigadier general and decorated veteran of the Vietnam War
 Hugh S. Jenkins, 35th Ohio Attorney General
 Edwin F. Flowers, lawyer, civil servant, judge; justice of the Supreme Court of Appeals of West Virginia
 Daniel Johnston, singer-songwriter, musician, and artist
 Oliver S. Marshall, member of the West Virginia Senate from the 1st district; Senate President from 1899 to 1901
 Deshawn L. Parker, two-time United States Champion Thoroughbred horse racing jockey
 Robert L. Ramsay, member of the U.S. House of Representatives from West Virginia's 1st district

See also
 List of cities and towns along the Ohio River

References

External links

Cities in Hancock County, West Virginia
County seats in West Virginia
West Virginia populated places on the Ohio River
Cities in West Virginia